Mr. Jones of Manor Farm is a fictional character in George Orwell's 1945  allegorical novel Animal Farm. Jones is an allegory for Tsar Nicholas II of Russia. Jones is overthrown by the animals of his farm, who represent Bolshevik and liberal revolutionaries.

Description
Mr. Jones had been a capable farmer once in his lifetime, but in the aftermath of a very damaging lawsuit he had become quite disheartened with his lot in life, as well as an alcoholic. This led to his neglect of both the animals and buildings of Manor Farm. Instigated by Old Major, the animals rebel by driving out Mr. Jones, his wife and his workers, and remove him from power, supposedly ending the days of extreme hunger and hard labour.

In the second chapter, an exiled Jones now lives at the Red Lion Inn, where he is feeling sorry for himself and commiserating with sympathetic and perplexed farmers (and more drinking). One day, the animals are at work when they see several humans on Animal Farm, not only their former masters but some neighboring farmers such as Frederick and Pilkington, and all agree that Jones and his farmhands are attempting to recapture the farm. He is defeated by Snowball's tactics. Many of the men are frightened by the organized animal defense, and the animals suffer only one death. Frightened, Jones flees the farm for good.

At the start of the final chapter, after 'years passed', Jones is mentioned to have died in a home for alcoholics. By this time, most of the animals on the farm were either born after the Rebellion; many of the remaining animals who were called to the barn by Old Major have died as well. It is mentioned that most of the deceased or exiled were forgotten – Snowball 'was forgotten' as was Boxer, excepting 'the few who had known him'. The days before the Rebellion have been forgotten as well. Only a few pigs, Moses the Raven (who was his 'special pet'), Clover and Benjamin remember Jones. The pigs and Moses obviously have no inclination to bring their former master up – they don't even mention Snowball, who was a scapegoat for a long number of years. Clover is an old and rather sick mare, past the retirement age that had been removed. Benjamin is merely more cynical.

Portrayals
In the 1954 animated adaptation of the novel, Jones was voiced by Maurice Denham, who provided all voices bar the narration. The story is fairly faithful to the novel, except Jones is not married and never leaves the area and instead remains in his local pub. When the other major farmers decide to make an attempt to seize Animal Farm, Jones offers to join them but is turned down. Instead, he acquires a large quantity of dynamite and destroys the windmill with himself still inside (due to being drunk).

Pete Postlethwaite portrayed Jones in the 1999 live-action film, as a brutish yokel who is highly in debt and is the laughingstock of the neighboring farms for his poor farm, although his alcoholism is toned down. In this film, he and Mrs. Jones destroy the windmill together before fleeing the area. What happened to them afterwards is never revealed.

Tony Robinson portrayed Jones in the 1994 featurette Down on Animal Farm, a documentary about the making of the 1954 adaptation.

References

Animal Farm characters
Literary characters introduced in 1945
Fictional farmers
Fictional characters based on real people
Fictional alcohol abusers
Male characters in literature